Sh2-106, also known as the Celestial Snow Angel, is an emission nebula and a star formation region in the constellation Cygnus.  It is a H II region estimated to be around 2,000 ly (600 pc) from Earth, in an isolated area of the Milky Way

In the center of the nebula is a young and massive star that emits jets of hot gas from its poles, forming the bipolar structure.  Dust surrounding the star is also ionized by the star.  The nebula spans about 2 light-years across.

Central star
The central star, a source of infrared radiation usually referred to as S106 IR or S106 IRS 4, is believed to have been formed only 100,000 years ago. It is a massive star, approximately 15 solar masses. Two jets of matter streaming from its poles heat surrounding matter to a temperature of around 10,000 °C.  Dust that is not ionized by the star's jets reflect light from the star. With an estimated surface temperature of 37,000°K, it is classified as a type O8 star.

Studies of images has revealed that the star-forming region has also created hundreds of low-mass brown dwarf stars and protostars.

References

External links

H II regions
Emission nebulae
Cygnus (constellation)
Sharpless objects
Star-forming regions